The Wills' 1928 cricketers was a set of trading cards issued by the Imperial Tobacco Co. under its W.D. & H.O. Wills brand. It consisted of a series of 50 collectable cigarette cards to commemorate leading first-class cricketers who had played county cricket in the 1927 English cricket season; and including nine who had toured South Africa in 1927–28 with the Marylebone Cricket Club team. This set is now a collectible and, in mint condition, has an estimated value (2017) of £90.

Overview
47 of the players chosen for the series, including the three who played for Glamorgan, were English. The three exceptions were the Australian Test fast bowler Ted McDonald; the Indian-born batsman Duleepsinhji, though he later played for England; and Douglas Jardine, who was born in India of Scottish parents. One player, Roy Kilner, had died in April 1928 just a few weeks before publication. All of the seventeen county clubs then taking part in the County Championship are represented in the series. Most of the players in the series were veterans in 1928, only ten being under 30. The oldest player was Wilfred Rhodes, aged 50; the youngest was Duleepsinhji, aged 22.

Each card has a 1–50 series number determined alphabetically by surname. All players are named on the front and back of the card by initials preceding surname. Players who had amateur status are prefixed "Mr." (e.g., Mr. A. P. F. Chapman) or, in two cases, "Hon." (e.g., Hon. F. S. G. Calthorpe). There is an artist's impression of each player on the front of the card; seventeen are portraits and 33 depict the player in action.

Series information

Key

 # – card number in series (i.e., 1–50)
 Player – the name is that given on the front and back of the card, except in the cases of Nobby Clark and Ted McDonald where significant errors have occurred
 Player's name in bold – the player took part in Test cricket during his career (with the exception of McDonald, who was Australian, all the Test players represented England)
 Club – generally, the first-class club(s) whom the player represented in 1927 and was expected to represent in 1928
 Age – the player's age at 28 April 1928, the opening day of the first-class season; Roy Kilner's age is at 5 April 1928, the date of his death
 Type – an amalgam of initialisms (see below) which describe the player's style of batting and bowling (some players are specialist batsmen); and (if appropriate) wicketkeeper
 RHB – right-handed batsman
 LHB – left-handed batsman
 WK – wicketkeeper
 RF – right-arm fast bowler
 LF – left-arm fast bowler
 RFM – right-arm fast medium bowler
 LFM – left-arm fast bowler
 RM – right-arm medium pace bowler
 LM – left-arm medium pace bowler
 LB – right-arm leg break bowler
 OB – right-arm off break bowler
 SLA – orthodox slow left-arm spin bowler
 picture – confirms the card picture as a portrait or states the type of action being depicted
 notes – includes a summary of the "pen picture" on the back of the card
 WY ccyy – year in which the player was elected a Wisden Cricketer of the Year (i.e., the year of the Wisden issue)

Checklist

Bibliography

References

Wills
Wills
Wills